Roosevelt may refer to:
Theodore Roosevelt (1858–1919), 26th U.S. president
Franklin D. Roosevelt (1882–1945), 32nd U.S. president

Businesses and organisations
 Roosevelt Hotel (disambiguation)
 Roosevelt & Son, a merchant bank
 Roosevelt Institute, a think tank

Educational establishments
 Roosevelt School (disambiguation)
 Roosevelt Elementary School (disambiguation)
 Roosevelt Middle School (disambiguation)
 Roosevelt High School (disambiguation)
 Roosevelt School District (disambiguation)
 Colegio Franklin Delano Roosevelt, The American School of Lima, Peru
 Eleanor Roosevelt College, University of California, San Diego, U.S.
 President Theodore Roosevelt High School, Honolulu, Hawaii, U.S.
 Roosevelt Intermediate School, Westfield, New Jersey, U.S.
 Roosevelt University, Illinois, U.S.
 University College Roosevelt, formerly Roosevelt Academy, Middelburg, the Netherlands

People
 Roosevelt family, U.S. political family
 Roosevelt (name)
 List of people with surname Roosevelt
 Roosevelt (musician) (Marius Lauber, born 1990), German singer and songwriter

Places
 Roosevelt Bridge (disambiguation)
 Roosevelt County (disambiguation)
 Roosevelt Hall (disambiguation)
 Roosevelt Island (disambiguation)
 Roosevelt Park (disambiguation)
 Roosevelt Township (disambiguation)

United States
 Roosevelt, Arizona
 Roosevelt, Kentucky
 Roosevelt, Minnesota
 Roosevelt Township, Minnesota (disambiguation)
 Roosevelt, Missouri
 Roosevelt, New Jersey
 Roosevelt, New York
 Roosevelt, Oklahoma
 Roosevelt, Texas (disambiguation)
 Roosevelt, Utah
 Roosevelt, Washington
 Roosevelt, Seattle, Washington
 Roosevelt, Wisconsin (disambiguation)
 Roosevelt Street, in Manhattan, New York
 Franklin D. Roosevelt Lake, also called Lake Roosevelt, Washington

Elsewhere
 Roosevelt, Rivadavia Partido, Buenos Aires, Argentina
 Roosevelt Avenue, Quezon City, Philippines
 Roosevelt Campobello International Park, New Brunswick, Canada
 Roosevelt Range, Greenland
 Roosevelt River, Brazil

Transportation
 Roosevelt Bridge (disambiguation)
 Roosevelt Expressway (disambiguation)
 Roosevelt Highway (disambiguation)
 Roosevelt Station (disambiguation)
 Roosevelt (automobile), U.S., 1929–1930

Ships
 , two steamships
 , an American steamship 
 , several U.S. Navy ships

Other uses
 Roosevelt, a 2016 album by The Spinto Band
 Roosevelt, a 2016 album by Roosevelt (musician)
 Roosevelt Apartment Building, a historic building in Washington D.C., U.S.
 Roosevelt elk, North America
 Roosevelt Raceway, in Long Island, New York, U.S.
 Roosevelt Roads Naval Station, former United States Naval Station in Puerto Rico
 Roosevelt's shrew, a mammal

See also
 
 
 President Roosevelt (disambiguation)